The 2001 NCAA Division I women's volleyball tournament began on November 29, 2001 with 64 teams and ended December 15 when Stanford defeated Long Beach State 3 games to 0 in San Diego, California for the program's fifth NCAA title.

Led by future Olympians Logan Tom and Ogonna Nnamani, Stanford stunned previously unbeaten Long Beach State in the title match. Long Beach State was attempting to become the first program to go undefeated in more than one season, as they went 36-0 just 3 years before in 1998.

On their way to the title, Stanford was able to knock off defending champion Nebraska in the national semifinals. The other semifinal participant, Arizona, made the program's first NCAA Final Four appearance.

The win gave Stanford head coach John Dunning, who was in his first year as Stanford's head coach, his third NCAA title as he won two with Pacific in the 1980s.

This was the first year of rally point scoring in the NCAA Division I tournament, with games going to 30 points to win. Previous years used the side out scoring (SOS), with 15 points needed to win. Games became "sets" in 2008 and were reduced to 25 points to win.

Records

Long Beach Regional

Los Angeles Regional

Stanford Regional

Lincoln Regional

Final Four – Cox Arena, San Diego, CA

National Semifinals

Long Beach State vs. Arizona

Top ranked and undefeated Long Beach State easily defeated Arizona in three sets. Tayyiba Haneef led Long Beach with 21 kills. Long Beach out-hit Arizona .384 to .216, out-blocked the Wildcats 10 to 8 and had 8 service aces while Arizona had just 3. Arizona was led by Shannon Torregrosas's 14 kills. Arizona ended their season at 25-5 with the program's first ever Final Four appearance. Long Beach upped their record to 33-0.

Stanford vs Nebraska

Led by Logan Tom's 22 kills, Stanford knocked off defending national champion Nebraska in three sets. Ogonna Nnamani added 13 kills to help the Cardinal sweep. Stanford out-blocked Nebraska, 12 to 9, and hit .270 as a team while Nebraska hit just .186. Nancy Metcalf led Nebraska with 14 kills as Nebraska ended their season at 31-2. Stanford advanced to the program's ninth NCAA title match.

National Championship: Long Beach State vs. Stanford 

In the title match, Stanford stunned top ranked and previously undefeated Long Beach State in three sets.

In game 1, Stanford went up 20-14 before Long Beach State closed the gap to 23-22. Down 26-24, Long Beach State rallied off four straight points, and eventually earned game point at 29-27. The 49'ers squandered both opportunities, with a Logan Tom kill and a Long Beach hitting error tying it up at 29. A Tom kill gave Stanford the game, 31-29. It was the first time all season that Long Beach lost the first game of a match.

In game 2, Stanford went up 11-7, then extended the lead to 20-13. Stanford remained in control, going up 27-20 and earning game point at 29-23. Long Beach State, however, did not go away and reeled off five consecutive points to cut the deficit to 29-28. The comeback ended, however, on a 49er service error giving Stanford the game, 30-28.

Game 3 remained even midway through. Stanford led 15-14 at the media timeout, before a Logan Tom service ace gave the Cardinal some separation at 25-21. Stanford remained ahead, going up 28-24 after an Ogonna Nnamani kill, before earning championship point after a Tom kill. A Stanford block ended the match, 30-25, ending Long Beach State's undefeated season, while Stanford ended their season at 33-2 - with one of the losses coming from Long Beach State earlier in the year.

Stanford won their fifth NCAA title. The win over Long Beach improved Stanford's record to 2-0 against undefeated teams in the national championship, as Stanford beat previously undefeated UCLA in the 1992 final. Stanford head coach John Dunning became the first Division I coach to win the national championship at two different schools, as he led Pacific to back-to-back titles in 1985 and 1986.

References

NCAA Women's Volleyball Championship
NCAA
College sports tournaments in California
2001 in sports in California
Volleyball in California
December 2001 sports events in the United States
Sports competitions in San Diego
Women's sports in California